Lake Oesa is a body of water located at an elevation of  in the mountains of Yoho National Park, near Field, British Columbia, Canada, while a trail at the far end of the lake leads to Abbot Hut.

The lake gets its name from a Stoney language (Native American language) term for 'corner'. An alpine trail along the Yukness Ledges connects Lake Oesa to nearby Opabin Lake.

References

Yoho National Park
Oesa
Canadian Rockies